Ivor Gordon Davies  (21 July 1917 – 27 June 1992) was an Anglican priest who was the Archdeacon of Lewisham between 1972 and 1985.

Educated at the University of Wales, where he took a Second in Greats in 1939; and at the University of London (Bachelor of Divinity, 1951), Davies prepared for ordination at St Stephen's House, Oxford, being ordained deacon in 1941 and priest in 1942 for the Diocese of Llandaff. Following a three-year period as Curate at St Paul, Grangetown, Cardiff, he served between 1944 and 1947 as a chaplain to the forces before returning to parish work as Curate of St John the Baptist, Felixstowe between 1947 and 1949. Appointed Perpetual Curate (a title effectively identical to vicar) of St Thomas’, Ipswich in that year, he subsequently became a Residentiary Canon at Southwark Cathedral in 1957; serving as Diocesan Canon Missioner until his appointment as Archdeacon of Lewisham.

Ivor Davies served under three Bishops of Southwark, and was a key figure in the diocese during the episcopate of Mervyn Stockwood, whose tenure saw many changes and developments in theology and theological training, particularly during the 1960s when Southwark became known as the centre of the ferment which was nicknamed "South Bank Religion". Although himself an Anglo-Catholic in formation and in churchmanship, his early association with the Church in Wales Catholic wing seems to have become modified during his subsequent career in the Church of England, and he became a friend and associate of Honest to God author John AT Robinson during that prelate's time as Bishop of Woolwich. Indeed, Davies is credited with doing much to develop initiatives in pastoral care of the sick - and in modernising approaches to spiritual counselling, measures that would later be taken up by Robinson and others in due course.

Shortly after his retirement, he summed up the Stockwood and Robinson period in a way that also cast light on his own approach to ministry.

Following his retirement, Archdeacon Davies retired to Felixstowe, holding permission to officiate in the Diocese of St Edmundsbury and Ipswich until his death.

References

1917 births
Alumni of the University of Wales
Archdeacons of Lewisham
1992 deaths
British Anglo-Catholics
Anglo-Catholic clergy